Gypsy is a short feature film directed by David Bonneville. It premiered at Locarno and was SXSW Grand Jury Award nominee. The film was funded by the ICA - Portuguese Film Institute / RTP and produced by Bárbara Valentina and Fernando Vendrell.

The film tells us the story of a wealthy young man called Sebastian. He finds out he has a flat tyre and ends up accepting help from a Gypsy passer-by. In return Sebastian will have to give him a ride home... but they won't reach their expected destination.

Cast
Jaime Freitas
Tiago Aldeia

Festival Highlights
 The Cambridge Strawberry Shorts Film Festival (Cambridge Cinema Shorts Commendation)
 Romania Twelve Month Film Festival (Director of the Month Award - David Bonneville) 
 Annual Awards Shortcutz Viseu (Best Director Award - David Bonneville; Best Actor - Tiago Aldeia)
 Mexico International Film Festival (Golden Palm Award for Best Short Fiction)
 Elche International Festival of Independent Film (Elche City Award for Best Short Film)
 Shortcutz Xpress Faro (March Award and Audience Award for Best Film)
 Shortcutz Lisboa (February Award for Best Film)
 CBA Awards (Best Short Film Nominee)
 CinEuphoria Awards (National Competition: Top Shorts of the Year - David Bonneville; Best Actor - Tiago Aldeia; Best Cinematography - Vasco Viana)
 Shortcutz Porto (January Award for Best Film)
 Festival Caminhos do Cinema Português (Best Supporting Actor Award for Jaime Freitas)
 Aesthetica Short Film Festival (ASFF)
 Izmir International Short Film Festival (Golden Cat Award for Best International Fiction)
 QueerLisboa18 International Film Festival (Best Short Film - Audience Award)
 Shortcutz Xpress Viseu (Fortnight Award and September Award for Best Film)
 Faro International Short Film Festival (Medal for Best Fiction Film)
 Festival der Nationen (Lenzing Award in Silver)
 Tanger International Film Festival (nominee)
 Rhode Island Film Festival (Nominated)
 London ShortsOnTap (Jury Award - Best Film; Top 7 films of 2014)
 Toronto WildSounds Film Festival (Best Global Performance Award and Best Cinematography Award)
 Palm Springs International Film Festival (Live Action Award nominee)
 SXSW Film Festival (Grand Jury Award nominee)
 Brest European Short Film Festival (Official selection)
 Tampere Film Festival (Official competition)
 Guadalajara Mexico Film Festival (Iberoamerican Shorts Competition)
 Cork Film Festival, Ireland
 Istanbul Short Film Festival, Turkey
 Adana Golden Boll Film Festival (Competition Section)
 Leuven International Short Film Festival (Nomination) 
 Adana Golden Boll International Film Festival (Nomination)
 Kolkata Shorts International Film Festival (Nomination: Best Film)
 Hamptons International Film Festival (1 of the 5 Golden Starfish Award nominees)
 Locarno International Film Festival (International premiere)
 Curtas Vila do Conde Short Film Festival (National premiere)
 Festival de Cannes Court Métrage, ShortFilmCorner (Distinction Coup de Coeur des Programmateurs Internationaux)

References

External links 
 
 Official website
 SXSW nominee
 Golden Starfish Award nominee
 Festival de Cannes Court-Métrage

2013 films
Portuguese drama films
Portuguese short films
2013 short films
2013 drama films